Three human polls and one formulaic ranking make up the 2008 NCAA Division I FBS (Football Bowl Subdivision) football rankings, in addition to various publications' preseason polls. Unlike most sports, college football's governing body, the NCAA, does not bestow a national championship title. That title is bestowed by one or more of four different polling agencies. There are two main weekly polls that begin in the preseason: the AP Poll and the Coaches Poll. About halfway through the season, two additional polls are released, the Harris Interactive Poll and the Bowl Championship Series (BCS) standings. The Harris Poll and Coaches Poll are factors in the BCS standings. At the end of the season, the BCS standings determine who plays in the BCS bowl games as well as the BCS National Championship Game.

Legend

AP Poll

Coaches Poll
The final Coaches Poll of the 2008 season (technically taking place in 2009) was notable in that the winner of the BCS Championship Game was not the unanimous number 1.  While the coaches are obligated to vote the winner of that game, Utah coach Kyle Whittingham voted his team number 1 after they defeated favored Alabama in the 2009 Sugar Bowl and completed the only undefeated season (13–0).

Harris Interactive Poll

BCS standings
The Bowl Championship Series (BCS) determined the two teams that competed in the 2009 BCS National Championship Game.

References

Rankings
NCAA Division I FBS football rankings
Bowl Championship Series